Hearn, Hearne, Hearns or Hearnes can refer to the following:

People
 Azeline Hearne, former slave in Texas
 Barry Hearn, British sports promoter
 Betty Cooper Hearnes, American politician
 Bunny Hearn, American baseball player, scout, and coach
 Chick Hearn, American sportscaster
 David Hearn (golfer), Canadian professional golfer
 Fil Hearn (born 1938), American architectural historian
 George Hearn may refer to several people, prominently :
 George Hearn, American actor
 George Hearne may refer to several people
 Glenn Hearn, American politician; former mayor of Huntsville, Alabama
 James Hearn, British vocalist
 Jeff Hearn, British sociologist
 Kevin Hearn, Canadian musician
 Kevin Hearne, American writer
 Lafcadio Hearn, Greek-born Irish-Japanese author
 Lian Hearn, pseudonym for Australian children's author Gillian Rubinstein
 Loyola Hearn, Canadian politician
 Mary Hearn, Irish doctor
 Michael Patrick Hearn, American scholar and writer
 Frank Hearne, English and South African cricketer
 Jack Hearne:
 J.T. Hearne (John Thomas), 19th century English cricketer
 J.W. Hearne (John William), 20th century English cricketer
 John Edgar Colwell Hearne, Jamaican novelist
 John Hearn may refer to several people
 John Hearne may refer to several people
 John Hearne (composer), British composer
 John Hearne (lawyer), Irish legal scholar and diplomat
 Joyce Hearn (1929-2021), American politician and educator
 Richard Hearne 20th century English actor, comedian, producer and writer
 Richard L Hearn, Canadian electrical engineer
 Samuel Hearne, English explorer
 Taylor Hearn (American football), American football player
 Taylor Hearn (baseball), American baseball player
 Thomas Hearne (antiquarian), English antiquarian
 Thomas Hearne (artist), landscape painter
 Thomas Hearns, American professional boxer
 Travis Hearnes, Norwegian professional footballer
 Warren E. Hearnes, American politician

See also
Hearn (disambiguation)
Hearn family
Hern
Herne (surname)
Ahern
Ahearn
 
Hearn
Hearn